fussballdaten.de is a German-language website that predominantly collects comprehensive statistics on the top five tiers of German football.

The website offers statistics on every Bundesliga, 2. Bundesliga and 3. Liga match and team since the leagues' foundation in 1963, 1974 and 2008, respectively.

References

External links 
  

Online databases
German sport websites
Football mass media in Germany